Wayfair Inc. is an American e-commerce company based in Boston, Massachusetts that sells furniture and home goods online. Formerly known as CSN Stores, it was founded in 2002, and currently offers 14 million items from more than 11,000 global suppliers.  It has offices and warehouses throughout the United States and in Canada, Germany, Ireland and the United Kingdom.

Wayfair operates five branded retail websites: the main Wayfair site, Joss & Main, AllModern, Birch Lane, and Perigold.

History

2002 to 2006
Entrepreneurs Niraj Shah and Steve Conine founded Wayfair in August 2002 as a two-person company with a makeshift headquarters in Conine's nursery in Boston, Massachusetts. Both Shah and Conine hold Bachelor of Science degrees from Cornell University, and had run two previous companies: Simplify Mobile, and iXL, a global consulting firm.

, Shah is the chief executive officer, and Shah and Conine share the chairman position.

Originally known as CSN Stores (derived from a combination of Shah and Conine's initials), the company began with the website racksandstands.com, selling media stands and storage furniture.

In 2003, it added patio and garden goods suppliers, three online stores, and more than a dozen employees, and moved its headquarters to an office on Newbury Street in Boston.

Over the next two years, it expanded its catalog to include home décor; office, institutional, and kitchen and dining furniture and materials; home improvement goods; bed and bath materials; luggage and lighting. In 2006, it had $100million in sales.

2007 to 2010
The company expanded in the United States and into international markets. 

In 2008, CSN Stores began shipping to Canada and selling in the United Kingdom, and opened a London office. The Boston Business Journal ranked it the #1 fastest-growing private e-commerce company in Massachusetts, and the #4 fastest-growing private company overall. 

In 2009, it expanded to Germany. In 2010, it relocated its headquarters to 177 Huntington Avenue, where they occupied 10 floors. At the end of that year, it launched Joss & Main, a members-only online store.

2011 to 2019
By 2011, CSN Stores owned over 200 online shops—largely niche shops for specific products, like cookware.com, everyatomicclock.com, and strollers.com. In an effort to scale, direct traffic to a single site, and unify the company aesthetic, Shah and Conine rebranded CSN Stores as Wayfair (a name chosen by a branding firm, with no other meaning).

To market its new brand and continue its expansion, in June 2011 the company raised $165million in funding from the investment firms Battery Ventures, Great Hill Partners, HarbourVest Partners and Spark Capital.

Wayfair.com launched on September 1, 2011. As of July 2012, it had consolidated all of its niche websites, with the exception of Joss & Main and AllModern, into Wayfair.com. In August 2012, it launched Wayfair Supply, a single destination for Wayfair's business, government and institutional customers. In August 2013, it acquired DwellStudio, a New York City-based design house and retailer focused on modern home and family furnishings.

2014
In March 2014, T. Rowe Price led a $157million pre-IPO financing, valuing the company at more than $2billion.

In late June 2014, the company again relocated its headquarters, this time to 4 Copley Place, about a block from its previous headquarters. It also opened two satellite offices in the surrounding area.

In October 2014, Wayfair raised over $300million through an IPO on the  New York Stock Exchange under the ticker symbol W. In July 2015, it sold its Australian business to local online retailer Temple & Webster for an undisclosed amount. The brand was renamed Zizo and later absorbed into the Temple & Webster business.

, Wayfair was the largest online-only retailer for home furniture in the United States, and the 33rd largest online retailer in the United States. It generated $380million in revenue in 2010, over $500million in 2011, over $600million in 2012, over $900million in 2013, and over $1.3billion in 2014. In 2015, its net revenue increased to $2.25billion, to $3.4billion in 2016 and to $4.7billion in 2017.

2017
Wayfair spent more than $500million in advertising in 2017 and was on target to spend more in 2018.

In 2017, a South Dakota lawsuit aimed at forcing Wayfair to collect and pay state sales tax made it to the US Supreme Court, South Dakota v. Wayfair, Inc.  The court held that states may charge tax on purchases made from out-of-state sellers, even if the seller does not have a physical presence in the taxing state.

2018
The company hosted its first "Way Day" sale on April 25, 2018. Sales quadrupled compared to an average day in March, according to a report from analytics firm Edison Trends. The number of unique buyers on Way Day also rose nearly 400% compared to the March average, although the average order price spent on Way Day ($276) was about the same as in March ($275), according to that report.

According to an August 2018 article in The Boston Globe, Wayfair added an additional 2,000 employees in the first half of 2018, and the total number of employees approached 10,000. The company will be soon expanding to another building near Copley Square with office space for an additional 4,000 employees.

According to a marketing professor at Emory University, the company is losing $10 for every new customer acquisition.

On December 13, 2018, the Massachusetts Economic Assistance Coordinating Council approved a $31.4million tax break for Wayfair in exchange for a pledge to increase their hiring by at least 3,000 in Boston and 300 jobs at a new call center in Pittsfield. The tax break is one of the largest ever awarded by the state.

2019
On March 26, 2019, Wayfair announced that its first permanent physical storefront would open in the Natick Mall in Natick, Massachusetts. The retailer had previously tested a few temporary pop-up storefronts during the 2018 holiday season, and confirmed plans to open four additional pop-up storefronts in 2019.

Investors sued Wayfair, claiming the company's executives misled them about the company's value and actions, losing them money as the top brass cashed out. The case was dismissed in 2020.

In May 2019, Wayfair was added to the Fortune 500 list for the first time, coming in at number 446.

During participation on a business panel on September 19, 2019, CEO Niraj Shah was asked what Wayfair was looking for in new hires and he said the company was looking for employees who are talented and non-political. According to the Boston Business Journal Shah was quoted as saying, "We're generally just looking for people on two sets of criteria. One, it's just that … they're incredibly talented. They're intelligent, quantitative. Just that we think they have the raw material to really succeed and we feel confident. The second thing we look for — equally important — is the cultural fit. So we're bringing in non-political, you know, highly collaborative, just very driven and ambitious. There's a whole lot of cultural values that we think are important while we succeeded. We only hire (those candidates) who have these two sets; both kinds of traits for success."  Later, when asked about Shah's comments in the article, Wayfair said in a statement that Shah's quote was "misinterpreted and inaccurately positioned in this story."

Employee walk-out 
On June 25, 2019, Wayfair employees announced plans to walk out in protest of a BCFS contract to sell beds to temporary migrant detention camps in a letter to senior management, including Niraj Shah and Steve Conine. Wayfair leadership responded indicating they would not terminate the order, and did not indicate they would donate the profit from the order (approximately $86,000) to charity, as the letter requested. Congresswoman Alexandria Ocasio-Cortez expressed her support for the employees and the walkout. On June 26, 2019, several hundred Wayfair employees walked out.

In late October 2019, the company announced it had hired 1,500 people in the last quarter, had a net loss of $272 million, and a revenue increase of 36 percent over the previous year.

2020-present
On February 13, 2020, the company announced a layoff of 550 employees or about three percent of their global workforce. The headquarters in Boston accounted for 350 of those employees let go. Chief executive Shah notified employees in an e-mail saying, "On reflection this last period of investment went on too long . . . and we find ourselves at a place where we are, from an execution standpoint, investing in too many disparate areas, with an uneven quality and speed of execution." As of 2020, the company has yet to show a profitable quarter.

Wayfair won the 2020 Webby Award for Shopping in the category Apps, Mobile & Voice.

On July 10, 2020, Wayfair became the subject of a QAnon-affiliated conspiracy theory falsely accusing the company of being involved in child sex trafficking as a front organization.

In 2022, Wayfair announced the opening of a flagship store in the King of Prussia Mall outside of Philadelphia, PA.

2022 
On August, 19 2022 CEO Niraj Shah penned a letter to employees notifying them that approximately 900 positions were to be laid off. Citing post-pandemic growth that "has not materialized as we had anticipated," Shah continues, "Our team is too large for the environment we are now in, and unfortunately we need to adjust."

Wayfair is facing losses and a stock shrinkage of 70% from the beginning of the year through August, and posted a loss of $378 million in 2022Q2. The CEO's letter notes severance packages of 10 weeks pay minimum to US-based employees. Those packages are expected to cost the company between $30 and $40 million.

Operations and infrastructure
Wayfair has over 12million square feet of warehouse space in Europe and North America with a dozen fulfillment centers. , the company offers 14million products from 11,000 global suppliers. Wayfair employs over 2,300 engineers and data scientists and 3,000 customer service representatives in Boston; Berlin; Ireland; and other cities in the United States. The company expected to spend more than $1billion in marketing and advertising in 2019.

Board of directors 
, the board of directors is:

References

External links
 
 

2002 establishments in Massachusetts
American companies established in 2002
Companies based in Boston
Companies listed on the New York Stock Exchange
Online retailers of the United States
Retail companies established in 2002
2014 initial public offerings
Home decor retailers
Furniture retailers of the United States
False allegations of sex crimes